Draymonia is a genus of flies in the family Stratiomyidae.

Species
Draymonia nitida (Aubertin, 1930)

References

Stratiomyidae
Brachycera genera
Diptera of South America